Parallelodiplosis is a genus of gall midges, insects in the family Cecidomyiidae. There are at least 20 described species in Parallelodiplosis.

Species
These 23 species belong to the genus Parallelodiplosis:

 Parallelodiplosis abdominalis (Felt, 1921) i c g
 Parallelodiplosis acernea (Felt, 1907) i c g
 Parallelodiplosis aprilis (Felt, 1912) i c g
 Parallelodiplosis autumnalis Grover & Madhu Bakhshi, 1978 c g
 Parallelodiplosis bimaculata Hardy, 1960 i c g
 Parallelodiplosis bupleuri (Rübsaamen, 1895) c g
 Parallelodiplosis carpinicola (Kieffer, 1913) i c g
 Parallelodiplosis caryae (Felt, 1907) i c g
 Parallelodiplosis cattleyae (Molliard) i c g
 Parallelodiplosis florida (Felt, 1908) i c g
 Parallelodiplosis galliperda (Low, 1889) c g
 Parallelodiplosis hartmaniae (Felt, 1921) i c g
 Parallelodiplosis indorensis Grover, 1979 c g
 Parallelodiplosis montana (Felt, 1908) i c g
 Parallelodiplosis nixoni (Felt, 1908) i c g
 Parallelodiplosis ramuli (Felt, 1907) i c g
 Parallelodiplosis rotunda Chandra, 1993 c g
 Parallelodiplosis rubrascuta (Felt, 1907) i c g
 Parallelodiplosis sarae Gagne, 1972 i c g
 Parallelodiplosis spirae (Felt, 1909) i c g
 Parallelodiplosis subtruncata (Felt, 1907) i c g b
 Parallelodiplosis tolhurstae (Felt, 1908) i c g
 Parallelodiplosis triangularis Grover & Kashyap, 1991 c g

Data sources: i = ITIS, c = Catalogue of Life, g = GBIF, b = Bugguide.net

References

Further reading

 
 
 
 
 

Cecidomyiinae
Articles created by Qbugbot
Cecidomyiidae genera